Anantanarayanan Madhaviah (16 August 1872 – 22 October 1925) is one of the pioneer Tamil writers, novelists and journalists. His writings were about social reformation and misogyny in society. He is the author of one the early Tamil Novels named Padmavathi sarithiram.

His book Muthumeenakshi is a commentary on marital politics, sexuality, female illiteracy and patriarchy in his time in south India. His take on the reformation in society can be achieved through education.

Early life

Madhaviah was born in Perungulam, Tirunelveli District. He studied Bachelors degree from Madras Christian College in 1892 and taught in the same college for five years. He married at the age of 15 to 11 year old girl Meenakshi.

Partial works

Novel

In Tamil

Padmavathi sarithiram (1898)
Muthumeenakshi (1903)
Vijayamarthandam (1903)

In English
Thillai Govindan (1903)
Satyananda (1909)
The story of Ramanyana (1914)
Clarinda (1915)
Lieutenant Panju (1915)
Markandeya (1922)
Nanda (1923)
Manimekalai (1923)

Critics
His writings are criticized as being ambivalent toward British Protestant missions in the Madras Presidency. During his time the university students in South India had different family background and when they met the western philosophies it created new thoughts for them which were felt reformist in that era.

References

1872 births
1925 deaths
Tamil writers
English writers
Indian social reformers